The 1939 Grand National was the 98th renewal of the Grand National horse race that took place at Aintree near Liverpool, England, on 24 March 1939.

The winning jockey was Irishman Tim Hyde, riding 100/8 shot Workman.
Workman was trained by Jack Ruttle, for owner Sir Alexander Maguire. MacMoffat finished in second place, Kilstar was third, and Cooleen fourth for the second consecutive year.

Thirty-seven horses ran, competing for the £10,000 in prize money, and all returned safely to the stables.

Finishing order

Non-finishers

References

 1939
Grand National
Grand National
20th century in Lancashire
March 1939 sports events